Friedrich "Fritz" Hartnagel (February 4, 1917 – April 29, 2001) was a lawyer and soldier of the Wehrmacht during World War II. In the 1950s, Hartnagel, then a judge in Stuttgart, campaigned against the rearmament of the Federal Republic. He was Sophie Scholl's fiancé.

Life 
Fritz Hartnagel was born to Friedrich Hartnagel (1879–1957) and Barbara Hartnagel née Strobl (1878–1945) on  February 4, 1917.  When Hitler first came to power Hartnagel was entranced by him and his vision for Germany.  He volunteered for an officer career in the spring of 1936 after an early Abitur and was a professional officer of the Wehrmacht until the end of World War II.

Relationship with Sophie Scholl 
In 1937, Hartnagel met Sophie Scholl at a dance event. Under Scholl's influence and after experiences on the front (including in the Battle of Stalingrad), Hartnagel changed from an enthusiastic soldier to an opponent of war and Nazi dictatorship. He supported the resistance activities with news about the course of the war and war crimes and with amounts of money (including ) although he never officially joined any resistance movements.

Hartnagel was not made aware that Sophie Scholl had been captured until he received a letter from Sophie's mother. When he learned, he immediately checked himself out of the Polish hospital he was in (he suffered frostbite in Russia, which had led to a partial amputation of his hand) and raced to Munich. While at a stop in Berlin, he telephoned the Scholls' house to find out if there were any more details available about her arrest. The phone was answered by Werner Scholl, who had to break the news that Sophie had been executed the day before.

After the execution of Hans and Sophie on the 22nd February 1943, Hartnagel assisted the Scholl family. After the remaining members of the Scholl family  were put into Sippenhaft (clan arrest), Hartnagel appealed for clemency for them. After they were released, he supported them financially.

After the War 
On April 14, 1945, Hartnagel was captured by US troops and kept as a prisoner of war until September 1945. In October 1945, he married Sophie's sister Elisabeth Scholl, with whom he had grown close after Sophie's execution. Together, they had four boys.

In 1946, Hartnagel began law studies at the Ludwig Maximilian University in Munich (the same college Sophie Scholl had gone to). He completed his studies and became a judge. He died on April 29, 2001, at the age of 84.

Legacy 
After his death, the letters between him and Sophie were compiled and published. Sophie and his’ story was also the basis for the novel “With you there is light”, published in 2016.

References 

1917 births
2001 deaths
German Army officers of World War II
Reich Labour Service members
Military personnel from Ulm